Clio is an unincorporated community in Livingston Parish, Louisiana, United States. Clio is only a few feet above sea level and almost completely surrounded by swamps with a small entrance from the northwest side.

History
The Waterson plantation with a sawmill, sugar mill, and warehouse was located near the bank of the Amite river. In 1962 while being interviewed by the Denham Springs News a local citizen named Winny Smiley the wife of Cyrus Luther Tucker described how Clio looked in 1885:

References

Unincorporated communities in Livingston Parish, Louisiana
Unincorporated communities in Louisiana